Susan Marjorie Scott  is an Australian mathematical physicist whose work concerns general relativity, gravitational singularities, and black holes. She is a Professor of Theoretical Physics at the Australian National University (ANU).

At ANU, she is the leader of the General Relativity Theory and Data Analysis Group, part of the LIGO Scientific Collaboration that has discovered gravity waves from collisions involving black holes and neutron stars, and is a member of the LIGO Scientific Collaboration Council.

Education and career
Scott studied mathematics and physics at Monash University and has a doctorate in mathematical physics from the University of Adelaide. She spent four years working with Roger Penrose at the University of Oxford and was a Rhodes Visiting Fellow at Somerville College, before joining the Australian National University faculty in 1998. She is a Chief Investigator for the Australian Research Council Centre of Excellence for Gravitational Wave Discovery (OzGrav).

Recognition
Scott was elected fellow of the Australian Academy of Science in 2016. In 2020, she was elected Fellow of the American Physical Society. In 2020, she was a joint winner of the Prime Minister's Prize for Science. She received the Walter Burfitt Prize from the Royal Society of New South Wales in 2022 and was awarded the Thomas Ranken Lyle Medal by the Australian Academy of Science in 2023.

References

External links

Living people
Australian physicists
Australian women physicists
Monash University alumni
University of Adelaide alumni
Academic staff of the Australian National University
Fellows of the Australian Academy of Science
Fellows of the American Physical Society
Fellows of Somerville College, Oxford
Year of birth missing (living people)